is a railway station on the Karatsu Line  operated by JR Kyushu located in Taku, Saga Prefecture, Japan.

Lines

Station layout 
The station, which is unstaffed, consists of two opposed side platforms serving two tracks. Access to the opposite side platform is by means of a footbridge. A waiting room and toilet building has been built near the footbridge. A siding branches off track 2.

Adjacent stations

History 
The Karatsu Kogyo Railway had opened a track from Miyoken (now ) which, by 25 December 1899, had reached Azamibaru (now ). On 23 February 1902, the company, now renamed the Karatsu Railway, merged with the Kyushu Railway which undertook the next phase of expansion. The track was extended east, with Kubota opening as the final eastern terminus on 14 December 1903. Higashi-Taku (then named ) opened on the same day as an intermediate station on the track.  When the Kyushu Railway was nationalized on 1 July 1907, Japanese Government Railways (JGR) took over control of the station. On 12 October 1909, the line which served the station was designated the Karatsu Line. On 1 June 1911, the station was renamed Higashi-Taku. With the privatization of Japanese National Railways (JNR), the successor of JGR, on 1 April 1987, control of the station passed to JR Kyushu.

Passenger statistics
In fiscal 2016, the daily average number of passengers using the station (boarding passengers only) was above 100 and below 323. The station did not rank among the top 300 busiest stations of JR Kyushu.

Environs
National Route 203
Higashi-Taku Post office
Nagasaki Expressway

References

External links
Higashi-Taku Station (JR Kyushu)

Railway stations in Saga Prefecture
Stations of Kyushu Railway Company
Karatsu Line
Railway stations in Japan opened in 1903